Finland has excellent communications, and is considered one of the most advanced information societies in the world.

Telephones

Telephones – main lines in use: 2.368 million (2004)

Telephones – mobile cellular: 4.988 million (2004)

Telephone system: General Assessment: Modern system with excellent service.

Domestic: Digital fiber-optic fixed-line network and an extensive cellular network provide domestic needs. There are three major cellular network providers with independent networks (Elisa Oyj, Telia Finland and DNA Oyj). There are several smaller providers which may have independent networks in smaller areas, but are generally dependent on rented networks. There is a great variety of cellular providers and contracts, and competition is particularly fierce.

International: Country code – 358; 2 submarine cable (Finland-Estonia and Finland-Sweden Connection); satellite earth stations – access to Intelsat transmission service via a Swedish satellite earth station, 1 Inmarsat (Atlantic and Indian Ocean regions); note – Finland shares the Inmarsat earth station with the other Nordic countries (Denmark, Iceland, Norway, and Sweden).

Radio and television

There is a national public radio and television company Yleisradio (Yle), which was previously funded by television license fees, but nowadays via the YLE tax. and two major private media companies, Alma Media and Sanoma, with national TV channels. Yle maintains four TV channels YLE1, YLE2, Teema and FST5. There are four commercial, national channels: Alma Media has MTV3 and SubTV, and Sanoma has Nelonen and Jim. There are also a lot of pay-TV channels. News Corporation introduced itself to the market in 2012 with the Fox channel, which was preceded by Finnish-owned SuomiTV.

Radio broadcast stations

AM 2, FM 186, shortwave 1 (1998)

Television broadcast stations

120 (plus 431 repeaters) (1999)

Television is broadcast as digital (DVB-T) only since August 2007. On cable, only digital (DVB-C) will be broadcast from 2008 on.

Internet

Internet country code: .fi

Internet hosts: 1,503,976 (2005)

Internet users: 3.286 million (2005)

In 2011, there were over 3.5 million broadband subscriptions in Finland, and the number of both them and mobile data transmission subscriptions continued to grow.

See also
 Finland
 Media of Finland

Further reading

 Cheung, Zeerim, Eero Alto and Pavi Nevalainen. 2020. "Institutional Logics and the Internationalization of a State-Owned Enterprise: Evaluation of International Venture Opportunities by Telecom Finland 1987–1998."  Journal of World Business

References

External links
 ThisisFINLAND – Media Moves